Tally Solutions Pvt. Ltd. is an Indian multinational technology company, that provides enterprise resource planning software. It is headquartered in Bangalore, Karnataka. The company reports that its software is used by more than 7 million customers.

History
Tally Solutions was co-founded in 1986 by Shyam Sunder Goenka and his son Bharat Goenka after the family's cotton business was destroyed by fire. It began as Peutronics Financial Accountant, an accounting software application. The company was incorporated in 1991 and was renamed Tally Solutions in 1999.

Shyam Sundar Goenka was running a company that supplied raw materials and machine parts to plants and textile mills in southern and eastern India. Unable to find software that could manage his books of accounts, he asked his son, Bharat Goenka, 23, a Maths graduate to create a software application that would handle financial accounts for his business. The first version of the accounting software was launched as an MS-DOS application. It had only basic accounting functions, and was named Peutronics Financial Accountant.
 In 2006, Tally launched Tally 8.1, a concurrent multi-lingual version, and also Tally 9.
 In 2009, the company released Tally.ERP 9, a business management solution
 In 2015, the company launched a program called Vriddhi to certify and classify its business partners. Also in 2015, Tally Solutions announced the launch of Tally.ERP 9 Release 5.0 with taxation and compliance features.
 In 2016, Tally Solutions was shortlisted as a GST Suvidha Provider to provide interface between the new Goods and Services Tax (GST) server and taxpayers, and in 2017, the company launched its updated GST compliance software.
 In 2020, the company released TallyPrime.
 In 2022, they introduced TallyPrime Edit Log.

Products and services 
Tally Solutions sells enterprise resource software and business management software to SMEs (small and medium-sized business enterprises.) The company's flagship product, Tally.ERP 9, was replaced by TallyPrime in 2020. In 2022, they worked with more than 28,000 partners.

 Tally Solutions has collaborated with Amazon Web Services to make its flagship product TallyPrime available on the cloud-computing platform

References

Companies based in Bangalore
Software companies of India
ERP software companies
Indian brands
Software companies established in 1986
Indian companies established in 1986
1986 establishments in Karnataka
Accounting software